Emma Asp (born 24 June 1987) is a Swedish former football defender. She played for Mallbackens IF from 2011 to 2015, where she earned 30 caps and scored a goal.

External links 
 

1987 births
Living people
Swedish women's footballers
Mallbackens IF players
Damallsvenskan players
Women's association football defenders